The WAGR C Class was a class of steam locomotives built by Robert Stephenson and Company for the Western Australian Government Railways in 1880 to the same design as the NZR F class.

History
The C class were ordered from Robert Stephenson and Company, Newcastle to operate services on the first railway line in Perth, which was the Eastern Railway from Fremantle to Guildford. However they were not ready when the line opened on 1 March 1881, with number 1 released from final assembly at Fremantle Railway Workshops the following day with number 2 entering service in May 1881. When delivered, they did not have bunkers with the wood that fired them having to be stowed in the cabs, so bunkers were retrofitted in May 1881 and August 1881. When engine class designations were introduced in 1885, they became the C class, numbered C1 and C2.

As the Perth railway network grew it became clear that the C class had insufficient fuel capacity. Both were rebuilt as 0-6-0STT saddle-tank tender engines with a small four-wheeled tender and new cylinders. This conversion necessitated the removal of the back cab wall. The original coal bunkers and cab front were retained although the bunkers were not used for coal storage.

The conversion of C1 was necessitated both through this insufficient capacity and also due to its having been involved in an accident in a crash on the Eastern Railway near Boya on 8 December 1885. It was recovered and transported back to the Fremantle Railway Workshops but did not re-enter service until 1887, when it emerged with its new tender. It had also been fitted with vacuum brakes.

Upon completion, they were reallocated to Spencers Brook to operate services to Northam, York and Beverley. Both were sold around the turn of the century for further service in the timber industry.

Class list

Preservation
C1 has been preserved at the Western Australian Rail Transport Museum.

Namesakes
The C class designation was reused for the C class locomotives from 1902 and again in the 1960s when the C class diesel locomotives entered service.

See also
Rail transport in Western Australia
List of Western Australian locomotive classes

References

External links

Railway locomotives introduced in 1881
Robert Stephenson and Company locomotives
C WAGR class (1881)
0-6-0T locomotives
3 ft 6 in gauge locomotives of Australia